The North Carolina Museum of Natural Sciences (NCMNS) is the largest museum of its kind in the Southeastern United States. It is the oldest established museum in North Carolina, located in Raleigh. In 2013, it had about 1.2 million visitors, and it was the state's most visited museum or historic destination among visitors.

The museum has six facilities on five campuses: the Nature Exploration Center and Nature Research Center on Jones Street in downtown Raleigh, the Prairie Ridge Ecostation satellite facility and outdoor classroom in Northwest Raleigh near William B. Umstead State Park, the former North Carolina Museum of Forestry in Whiteville, and the former Grifton Nature & Science Center in Grifton. In 2020 the newest facility, the North Carolina Museum of Natural Sciences at Greenville, was announced and opened to the public on September 18th, 2021. NCMNS is a division of the state Department of Natural and Cultural Resources.

History 

The North Carolina State Museum was created in 1879 by combining two existing state-owned collections of geologic and agricultural specimens. The museum was originally housed in the Briggs Building on Fayetteville Street. The museum's collections, outreach and education programs, and status grew over the next 60 years under the stewardship of H.H. Brimley. As part of the Department of Agriculture,  in 1887, the museum moved to a former hotel on Edenton Street across from the capitol building. An annex was added in 1899, but the entire facility was replaced by a purpose-built building in 1924. The facility was later renamed the North Carolina State Museum of Natural History.

In the 1950s and again in the 1990s, shifts in education further expanded the museum's holdings as universities donated their collections to the state.  In 1986, it became the North Carolina State Museum of Natural Sciences.

A new building opened later and NCMNS became the largest natural history museum in the Southeast.  In 2000, the museum expanded with a new location: the Museum of Forestry in Whiteville. This facility was later overhauled and reopened in 2015 as the NC Museum of Natural Sciences in Whiteville. Another location was added in 2004, with the opening of the Prairie Ridge Ecostation for Wildlife and Learning. The museum expanded its downtown campus in 2012 with the adjacent Nature Research Center.

The collection now contains more than 1.7 million specimens of amphibians, reptiles, birds,  fish, mammals, invertebrates, invertebrate and vertebrate fossils, plants, geology, and meteorites.

NCMNS is administered by the Department of Natural and Cultural Resources.

On July 14 2014, a dinosaur replica along with other items were stolen from NCMNS by two accomplices. The duo turned themselves in on July 17 2014. The replica, along with the other items were recovered.

Nature Exploration Center

First floor 

 Natural Treasures of North Carolina contains dioramas of various wildlife and artifacts pertaining to nature in North Carolina.
 Coastal North Carolina includes exhibits of fish native to North Carolina's coast and inland waterways.
 WRAL 3-D Theater – 3-D films are shown daily in this 250-seat venue.
 Box Office - Although entrance to the museum is free, tickets to the WRAL 3-D theater and the special exhibits (located on the 2nd floor) must be purchased either online or at the box office near the main entrance.

Second floor 
 The North Carolina: Mountains to the Sea exhibit displays North Carolina's natural habitats from the western mountains through the central Piedmont and on to the Coastal Plain highlighting the interrelationships between them.
 Underground North Carolina features gems and minerals of North Carolina, as well as ground, soil, and seismic displays.
 The Nature's Explorers exhibit covers the museum's beginnings, showing the tools and techniques naturalists used 100 years ago to collect and preserve specimens.
 The Discovery Room is a family-oriented hands-on exhibit for exploring the natural world using a combination of natural, live, and human-made objects.
 Special Exhibition gallery.
 A covered bridge to the Nature Research Center, which also has a timeline on display.

Third floor 

 Prehistoric North Carolina chronicles prehistoric life in the state and throughout the southeastern United States, and contains the reconstruction of an Eremotherium giant ground sloth excavated by the museum.
 The Terror of the South exhibit features fossil skeletons, including an Acrocanthosaurus.
 The Tropical Connections section is anchored by a large interactive globe which allows visitors to highlight the climate regions of the Earth. This exhibit focuses on environmental issues.
 In the Windows on the World theater, museum volunteers and employees give frequent demonstrations and talks, and share live animal visits with museum visitors as well as remotely to classrooms throughout the state.
 Two Curiosity Classrooms spaces
 Another Bridge to the Nature Research Center - the third-floor bridge is open-air with artwork depicting fossils along the walkway.
 A dinosaur short film in a room

Fourth floor 
 Arthropod Zoo – Live and static exhibits of the insects, crustaceans, arachnids and other arthropods in North Carolina.
Living Conservatory – A dry tropical forest exhibit with various live plants and animals, including butterflies and a two-toed sloth. A windowed chamber preceding the exhibit displays chrysalides of developing butterflies, and butterflies that have recently emerged.
 Acro Café

Nature Research Center 

The NRC and NEC are connected by a breezeway. The April 20, 2012, opening lasted 24 hours and drew 70,000 visitors.

The NRC provides hands-on activities and visitor-viewing of scientists working in the NRC's four research laboratories. The museum also makes use of distance learning to broadcast lessons and virtual field trips to classrooms around the state.

First floor

 SECU Daily Planet Theater – Inside the globe, a three-story theater hosts science presentations and scenes from nature.
 Our Changing Ocean – A  aquarium replicates a typical hardbottom habitat off the North Carolina coast.
 Investigating Right Whales – Visitors can see and touch the skeleton of "Stumpy", a North Atlantic right whale whose death led to laws that require slower cargo ship speeds in whale migration routes.
 Exploring the Deep Sea – A model submersible takes visitors on a virtual dive  to the ocean floor off the North Carolina coast.
 Exploratory Gallery – Presents projects and breakthroughs in engineering, health and modeling.
 Citizen Science Center – Exhibits on getting involved in scientific research and being a citizen scientist. 
 North Carolina's Green Gems – Emeralds discovered in North Carolina, including North America's largest cut emerald, the 64.8-carat Carolina Emperor.
 Giftshop
SECU DinoLab - Announced in 2020 and set to be built by 2022, the SECU DinoLab is a planned exhibit meant to house the Dueling Dinosaurs, a scientifically important specimen of a Tyrannosaurus and Triceratops locked in combat.

Second floor
 Researching Weather displays methods used to study the weather.
 Window on Animal Health – Visitors can view veterinary staff, students, and interns working on real medical procedures. The Window is equipped with 2-way audio between visitors and staff and offers video for visitors to view close-ups of microscopic images and medical procedures. Patients include species such as reptiles, amphibians, fish, birds, small mammals and invertebrates.
 Naturalist Center – Features some of the museum's 20,000 education specimens ranging from fossils and bones to preserved reptiles and birds. This exhibit also showcases audio and video of certain specimens at two interactive tabletops.

Third floor
 Unraveling DNA – DNA replication and model organisms.
 From Dinosaurs to DNA – new tools and techniques that are helping scientists study the natural world.
 Postcards from Space – collection of meteorites.
 Ice Age Giants – An exhibit showing that, although glaciers never reached North Carolina, climate changes may have spelled doom for the Ice Age animals that roamed the state.
 Early Life Explosion – Displays of Ediacaran fossils representing some of the earliest complex life on Earth (542-635 million years ago).

Investigate labs
The Nature Research Center's three investigate labs are open-to-the-public hands-on educational spaces.

 Natural World Investigate Lab (second floor) – Visitors can use a variety of tools to observe and study the natural world.
 Micro World Investigate Lab (third floor) – This lab focuses on the future of biotechnology and microbiology, from protozoa to genetic engineering.
 Visual World Investigate Lab (third floor) – Modeling and simulation technologies that help scientists visualize nature in new ways, including how a robot works and classes in electronics and computer programming.

Research labs
The Nature Research Center's four research labs are part of the museum's Research and Collections department. These spaces (normally reserved for behind-the-scenes work) have transparent glass walls through which the public can observe firsthand as research scientists do their work. The atrium is home to the LCD sculpture Patterned by Nature.

 Biodiversity and Earth Observation Research Laboratory (second floor) – This laboratory is the center for exploration of the flora and fauna of the community, state and planet. Studies focus on such areas as mammalian movement ecology.
 Astronomy and Space Observation Research Laboratory (third floor) – Astronomers in this lab use large telescopes around the world to investigate the origins of the Solar System by studying the chemical composition of gas clouds around forming stars.
 Genomics and Microbiology Research Laboratory (third floor) – In this lab, Biologists conduct a wide spectrum of molecular genetic studies to examine DNA-based relationships among primates (called comparative evolutionary genomics) and more.
 Paleontology and Geology Research Laboratory (third floor) – The focus of this laboratory is the morphology, evolutionary relationships and paleoecology of theropod dinosaurs—a group that includes the iconic megapredator Tyrannosaurus rex as well as all living birds.

Satellite facilities and branches

Prairie Ridge Ecostation 
It includes Piedmont prairie, forest, ponds, a stream, and sustainable building features integrated with a wildlife-friendly landscape.

Prairie Ridge furthers the museum's mission of enhancing public understanding and appreciation of the natural environment by providing an outdoor learning space while acting as a model for renewable and sustainable energy.

The facility opened a Nature PlaySpace on Saturday, September 28, 2013.

North Carolina Museum of Natural Sciences at Whiteville 
The North Carolina Museum of Natural Sciences at Whiteville, North Carolina formerly known as the North Carolina Museum of Forestry, is a satellite facility of the North Carolina Museum of Natural Sciences. Its mission is to celebrate the natural history and cultural heritage of North Carolina's forests through interpretive exhibits, educational programming, and the preservation of natural and man-made materials that demonstrate the ongoing relationship of forests and people.

Displays and interactive exhibits include an outdoor Tree Trail and Fossil Dig Pit, and the museum offers educational program experiences and special events.

North Carolina Museum of Natural Sciences at Contentnea Creek 
The North Carolina Museum of Natural Sciences at Contentnea Creek, formerly known as the Grifton Nature & Science Center, is a satellite facility and outdoor classroom located in Grifton, North Carolina. It features hiking and paddling trails centered around Contentnea Creek, along with an observatory and outdoor classroom.

North Carolina Museum of Natural Sciences at Greenville 
The North Carolina Museum of Natural Sciences at Greenville, North Carolina formerly known as A Time For Science (ATFS), is a satellite facility of the North Carolina Museum of Natural Sciences located in Greenville, North Carolina. It and the Grifton Nature and Science Center were acquired through a partnership between NCMNS and ATFS. The center was renovated with new exhibits being added and reopened in September 2021. The Museum at Greenville is largely based on the Raleigh facility, but with more exhibits focusing on subjects relevant to northeastern North Carolina such as pirates and pollinators, and includes resources from East Carolina University.

Notable annual events
NCMNS hosts many special events through the year. 

The most notable are:

On Groundhog Day, February 2, Sir Walter Wally makes his annual prediction for the arrival of the upcoming spring. Sir Walter has a 58% accuracy rating, which has earned him nationwide recognition for his prognostication ability.

BugFest, held in mid-September every year, is a free day-long festival devoted to insects. This event attracts more than 35,000 visitors per year. A smaller version of the festival, called BugFest South, is held at the Whiteville facility in May or June.

NCMNS participates in First Night Raleigh each year on December 31. In 2012, First Night drew 80,000 people to the blocks around the museum.

Acquisition of the Dueling Dinosaurs 
The Dueling Dinosaurs is an extremely well-preserved and scientifically important specimen from Montana of a Triceratops and Tyrannosaurus possibly locked in combat. First found in 2006, there were unsuccessful attempts by the fossil's finders to sell it to museums or private collectors for over a decade until the NCMNS reached out in 2016, prompting negotiations to purchase the fossil, with funds being raised by the nonprofit Friends of the North Carolina Museum of Natural Sciences. Legal issues significantly slowed these negotiations until they were resolved in 2020, leading the museum to announce its acquisition of the fossils as part of its permanent collection. The fossils are set to be put on display in the Nature Research Center.  After construction delays, the Dueling Dinosaurs exhibit will open in 2023.

References

External links 
 Official website

Natural history museums in North Carolina
Museums in Raleigh, North Carolina
NASA Museum Alliance
Smithsonian Institution affiliates
Natural Science Collections Alliance members
Nature centers in North Carolina
Dinosaur museums in the United States
Paleontology in North Carolina
Insectariums
Butterfly houses
1879 establishments in North Carolina
Museums established in 1879